Kanya King,  (born in Kilburn, London) is a British entrepreneur who is the founder of the MOBO Awards.

Biography
King was born in Kilburn, London, to an Irish mother and a Ghanaian father, being the youngest of their nine children. Her father died when she was 13 years old. Aged 16, she gave birth to her son, causing her to drop out of school.

Achievements
The first MOBO Awards took place in 1996 at London's Connaught Rooms, broadcast on Carlton Television.

In 1999, she was appointed a Member of the Order of the British Empire (MBE) and a CBE in the 2018 Birthday Honours List.

Other awards include an honorary fellowship of Goldsmiths College, University of London, an honorary Doctorate of Business Administration at London Metropolitan University (2006) as well as a Doctorate from Leeds Metropolitan University (2008).

In 2011, King was named one of London's Most Influential People by the London Evening Standard, one of Britain's Most Entrepreneurial Women (Real Business) and has been regularly listed in the Powerlist as one of Britain's Most Influential Black People. She was recognised by the music industry in 2016, being awarded the "Media Pioneer" award at the Music Week Women In Music Awards.

In 2017, Kanya King spoke to the Evening Standard about building the MOBO Awards brand from being a single mother at the age of 16. King also spoke to the NME about diversity and inclusion in creative industry, as well as Music Week' about the 22nd MOBO Awards being the strongest yet, .

King appeared alongside four multi-millionaire panel members in the ITV series Fortune - Million Pound Giveaway (2007), where members of the panel decide which "contestants" to award no-string grants, based on the merits of their pitch.

In February 2013, she was assessed as one of the 100 most powerful women in the United Kingdom by Woman's Hour'' on BBC Radio 4, and also recognized as one of the BBC's 100 women.

On 29 October 2015, King was listed by UK-based company Richtopia at number 60 in the list of 100 Most Influential British Entrepreneurs.

Honorary Fellowship at Goldsmiths University and Doctorates of Business at both the London Metropolitan University and Leeds Metropolitan University. 
Honoured patron of Music at the City of Westminster College.
"Contribution to Music Award" granted by the Ghana Black Star Network 
Presented with the Ambassador Award at the 12th annual NatWest Everywoman Awards 
Honorary Doctorate University of the Arts in recognition of commitment and success within the creative industries
Honorary Doctorate of Laws University of Exeter Outstanding Achievements in the field of entrepreneurship 
Lifetime Achievement Award from the Institute of Enterprise and Entrepreneurship (IOEE)
Honorary Doctor of Music, SOAS University of London

References

External links
 Kanya King - Official website

Year of birth missing (living people)
Living people
Alumni of Goldsmiths, University of London
BBC 100 Women
Black British women
Commanders of the Order of the British Empire
English people of Ghanaian descent
English people of Irish descent
People from Kilburn, London